The 2021 Liga 3 Jambi was the sixth season of Liga 3 Jambi as a qualifying round for the national round of the 2021–22 Liga 3.

Persibri Batanghari were the defending champion.

Teams
There are 15 teams participated in the league this season.

Venue
All matches was held in KONI Stadium, Batanghari.

Group stage

Group A

Group B

Group C

Group D

Knockout stage

Quarter final

(PS Muaro Jambi won 3–0 on penalty shoot-out.)

(Persikota Sungai Penuh won 5–4 on penalty shoot-out.)

Semi final

(PS Muaro Jambi won 4–1 on penalty shoot-out.)

Final

(Jambi United won 5–4 on penalty shoot-out.)

References

Liga 3